Dankov is a town and the administrative center of Dankovsky District in Lipetsk Oblast, Russia, located on the Don River  northwest of Lipetsk, the administrative center of the oblast. Population:  It was previously known as Donkov.

History
The fort of Donkov was founded by the Princes of Ryazan in the late 14th century and took its name from the Don River. It was then restored on a better fortified location but was again relocated in 1618. 
It is shown as Donko in Mercator's Atlas (1596), and as Donkagorod  in  Resania in Joan Blaeu's map of 1645.

By the 18th century, its spelling changed from Donkov to Dankov. The town was chartered by Catherine the Great but was demoted in status to that of a rural locality between 1796 and 1804 and again between 1924 and 1959.

Administrative and municipal status
Within the framework of administrative divisions, Dankov serves as the administrative center of Dankovsky District. As an administrative division, it is incorporated within Dankovsky District as Dankov Town Under District Jurisdiction. As a municipal division, Dankov Town Under District Jurisdiction is incorporated within Dankovsky Municipal District as Dankov Urban Settlement.

References

Notes

Sources

External links
Official website of Dankov 
Dankov Business Directory 

Cities and towns in Lipetsk Oblast
Dankovsky Uyezd
Populated places established in the 14th century